Saint-Zénon-du-Lac-Humqui is a parish municipality in Quebec, Canada.

Demographics 

See also
 List of parish municipalities in Quebec

References

Parish municipalities in Quebec
Incorporated places in Bas-Saint-Laurent
La Matapédia Regional County Municipality
Canada geography articles needing translation from French Wikipedia